The National Farmers' Union of Scotland is an organisation that promotes and protects the interests of the country's farming industry. It was formed in 1913, and has approximately 10,000 members who are farmers, crofters and others involved in Scottish agriculture.

The union stood a candidate in the 1918 Ross by-election, T. Preece; he took 35.4% of the votes cast, but was not elected.

The current president is Andrew McCornick.

See also
Farm assurance in Scotland
Farmers' Union of Wales
Irish Farmers' Association
National Farmers Union of England and Wales
Ulster Farmers Union

References

External links
Official website

1913 establishments in Scotland
Business organisations based in Scotland
Organisations based in Edinburgh
Organizations established in 1913
Farmers' organizations
Agricultural organisations based in Scotland